Statistics of Super Liga in season 2005/2006.

Club's

List of Participating team in Super Liga 2005/06
Académica
AD Esperança
ADR União
As Lero
Bulgaria
Cacussa
FC Café
FC Irmãos Unidos
FC Porto Taibesi
FC Rusa Fuik
FC Zebra
Fima Sporting
SLB Laulara

First stage

Grup A

Grup B

Grup C

Grup D

Playoff

Grup E
Round 1 
Fima Sporting 3-1 SLB Laulara
FC Rusa Fuik 0-0 Académica
Round 2
Académica - Fima Sporting
SLB Laulara - FC Rusa Fuik
Round 3 
Académica 3-2 SLB Laulara
Fima Sporting - FC Rusa Fuik
Winners: Fima Sporting
Runners-Up: Académica

Grup F
Round 1 
FC Zebra 0-0 FC Café
FC Porto Taibesi 0-2 AD Esperança
Winners: AD Esperança
Runners-Up: FC Zebra

Semifinals
AD Esperança 2-0 Académica
Fima Sporting 3-2 F C Zebra

Third place match
Académica 2-0 FC Zebra

Final
Fima Sporting 0-0 (pen 5-4) AD Esperança

References
East Timor - List of final tables (RSSSF)

2005
2005 in East Timorese sport
2006 in East Timorese sport
East